The Henry Pohlmann House is a historic building located in the West End of Davenport, Iowa, United States. Henry Pohlmann was a brick manufacturer who worked for his family firm of H.B. Pohlmann. The two-story brick house is a McClelland front gable that is a popular 19th-century vernacular architectural style in Davenport. The three-bay front has an off-centered main entrance and there is a polygonal window bay on the east side of the house. The house has been listed on the National Register of Historic Places since 1984.

References

Houses completed in 1885
Houses in Davenport, Iowa
Houses on the National Register of Historic Places in Iowa
National Register of Historic Places in Davenport, Iowa
Vernacular architecture in Iowa